Carnarvon Airport may refer to:

 Carnarvon Airport (Australia), in Carnarvon, Western Australia
 Carnarvon Airport (South Africa), in Carnarvon, Northern Cape